Modern Art is the eleventh studio album by alternative rock musician Matthew Sweet. It was released on Missing Piece in 2011.

Release
The album, available as a CD, 2-LP vinyl set, and digital download, was met with little commercial success, but with favorable reviews. Amazon.com wrote, "Defiantly unorthodox, but often playfully so, Modern Art features 12 new compositions of Sweet's trademark wistful, yearning pop that recall some of Sweet s touchstones: the Beatles, Beach Boys and Big Star", and even notes the work of Sweet's side-players: "Longtime musical cohort Ric Menck (Velvet Crush) does all the drumming on the album (except for "Ivory Tower", which is built on a random drum pattern supplied by Sweet's friend, actor/musician Fred Armisen). Dennis Taylor's deft and urgent guitar lines serve as a running commentary to Sweet's introspective singing. Finished by mastering engineer Glenn Schick, Modern Art promises to be another trend-setting release by Sweet."

Track listing

Personnel
Ric Menck – drums, percussion
Dennis Taylor – lead guitar
Matthew Sweet – bass, guitars, piano, Mellotron, organ, vocals, percussion
Fred Armisen – drums on "Ivory Tower"

References

2011 albums
Albums produced by Matthew Sweet
Matthew Sweet albums